Snovitsy is a rural locality (a selo) in Novoalexandrovskoye Rural Settlement, Suzdalsky District, Vladimir Oblast, Russia. Population:  1,765 as of 2010. There are 45 streets.

Geography 
Snovitsy is located on the left bank of the Sodyshka River, 37 km south of Suzdal (the district's administrative centre) by road. Verizino is the nearest rural locality.

References 

Rural localities in Suzdalsky District
Vladimirsky Uyezd